Luxxury (birth name Blake Robin), formerly known as Baron von Luxxury, is an American producer, songwriter, DJ and artist. His best known songs include "Be Good 2 Me" (as heard in the Xbox game Forza Horizon 4), "Feels So Good" (as heard exclusively in the  Xbox game Forza Horizon 5), "Breathe (Again)" and "Feel The Night"; earlier songs include "Drunk", which was used in commercials for Pontiac; "Sweet and Vicious", which was used on The Hills; and "I Know There's Something Going On", a cover of a song by Anni-Frid Lyngstad from ABBA. In addition to being the sole songwriter and producer for that band, he is a touring DJ as well as being an in-demand producer, remixer and songwriter formerly under contract with Razor and Tie Music Publishing for whom he has cowritten songs for artists including Vanessa Daou and Little Boots, as well as the song "If That's Love" (co-written with Jesse Owen Astin and Bonnie McKee), which was featured on the CSI: Miami episode, "Show Stopper". He was also a co-founder of the now defunct MP3 blog Disco Workout. Luxxury's 2012 full-length album "The Last Seduction" was released on Manimal Vinyl and featured songs about his friends Theresa Duncan and Jeremy Blake. The album received strong reviews and made it to several "best of 2012" lists, including that of Duran Duran's John Taylor.

In 2013 he began releasing a series of unofficial remixes called "LUXXURY Edits" using "(mostly) only original multitrack stems" for a number of famous songs including Eagles' "Hotel California", Duran Duran's "Girls on Film" and many more. As a result of the attention received he began to get commissioned remix work from artists including Greg Wilson, Melanie Martinez, Fitz and the Tantrums, and others.

A series of original singles moving away from "the synths and Moroder-y stuff from my earlier records" to "1979-style Rhodes piano, funky bass, vintage sounding beats and dreamy floaty vocals: Bee Gees meets Todd Terje" was announced in late 2015; the first single "Take it Slow" premiered on January 19, 2016,
 followed by a number of singles in a similarly vintage funk/disco vein. As a DJ, Robin performs a mix of live, on-the-fly remixes and sings his original material, often accompanied by one or more other musicians. Sometimes this includes a full live band, with whom he has performed opening for Giorgio Moroder, Escort and The Juan Maclean, including a performance on Last Call with Carson Daly.

Luxxury discography
 Just Like It Was Before (feat. Jill Lamoureux) (2021) Boogie Angst Records
 Let's Stay Together (2021) Nolita Records
 Don't Give Up (I Believe in You) (2021) Nolita Records
 Set Me Free (2020) Nolita Records
 It's Not Funny (2019) Nolita Records
 Change Yr Mind (ft. Adeline) (2019) Kitsuné
 Another Lifetime with Scavenger Hunt (2019) Nolita Records/AWAL
 i wanna be EVERYTHING (2018) Nolita Records
 Keep it Together with Kraak & Smaak (2018) Future Disco
 Be Good 2 Me (EP) (2018) Nolita Records
 Pleasure! (single) (2017) Nolita Records
 I Need You (single) (2017) Nolita Records
 Feel The Night (single) (2017) Nolita Records
 How to be Good (EP) (2016) Nolita Records
 Breathe (single) (2016) Eskimo Recordings
 What Do Ya Really Want (single) (2016) Plant Music
 Hold On/Take it Slow (EP) (2016) Deep&Disco
 Luxxury Edits Vol. 1 (2014) Exxpensive Sounding Music
 The Last Seduction (2012) Manimal Vinyl
 Sweet and Vicious: The Remixes (2007) Nolita Records
 Rock and Roll (is Evil) (2006) Razor & Tie/Nolita Records
 The Dirty Girls (Need Love Too) EP (2004) Nolita Records
 The Drunk EP (2004) Nolita Records

Remixes & Re-edits
 Matti Charlton - A Rocket Ship To The Moon (LUXXURY Vocal Edit Remix) (2021)
 Goldroom - Guess I'm Jaded (LUXXURY Remix) (2020)
 Gavin Turek - Whitney (LUXXURY remix) (2019)
 The Ramona Flowers - Strangers (LUXXURY remix) (2018)
 Hall & Oates - Maneater (LUXXURY edit) (2017)
 The Ramona Flowers - If You Remember (LUXXURY remix) (2017)
 Terrace - Tribeca (LUXXURY remix) (2017)
 New Order - Blue Monday (LUXXURY edit) (2016)
 Michael Jackson - Rock With You (LUXXURY edit) (2016)
 Valida - Stars (LUXXURY remix) (2016)
 Fitz and the Tantrums - HandClap (LUXXURY remix) (2016)
 Antenna Happy - Body (LUXXURY edit) (2016)
 Blue Öyster Cult - (Don't Fear) The Reaper (LUXXURY edit) (2016)
 Petula Clark - I'm Not In Love (LUXXURY edit) (2015)
 Led Zeppelin - Whole Lotta Love (LUXXURY edit) (2015)
 Melanie Martinez - Soap (LUXXURY Remix) (2015)
 Greg Wilson - Summer Came My Way (LUXXURY Remix) (2015)
 The Doors - Riders on the Storm (LUXXURY edit) (2015)
 Donna Summer - Bad Girls (LUXXURY edit) (2015)
 The Controversy - Two Voices (LUXXURY Remix) (2015)
 Slow Knights - Candy Sugar Rush (LUXXURY Remix) (2015)
 Talking Heads - Once in a Lifetime (LUXXURY edit) (2015)
 Kiss - I Was Made for Loving You (LUXXURY edit) (2015)
 Duran Duran – Girls on Film (LUXXURY edit) (2014)
 Blondie – Rapture (LUXXURY edit) (2014)
 Eagles – Hotel California (LUXXURY edit) (2014)
 The Clash - Rock The Casbah (LUXXURY edit) (2013)
 Fleetwood Mac – Rhiannon (LUXXURY edit) (2013)
 David Bowie – Golden Years (LUXXURY edit) (2013)
 Bee Gees – Night Fever (LUXXURY edit) (2013)
 Simon and Garfunkel – The Sound of Silence (LUXXURY edit) (2013)
 Foreigner – Urgent (LUXXURY edit) (2013)
 Madonna – Vogue (LUXXURY edit) (2013)
 Daisy O'Dell – Never (Baron von Luxxury Remix) (2013)
 Louise Burns – Paper Cup (Baron von Luxxury Remix) (2013)
 Fleetwood Mac – Rhiannon (Luxxury Re-edit) (2012)
 Trust – Dressed for Space (Baron von Luxxury Remix) (2012)
 Cameras – June (Baron von Luxxury Remix) (2012)
 Austra – Spellwork (Baron von Luxxury Remix) (2011)
 The Child – Boomerang (Baron von Luxxury Totally Goth Remix) (2011)
 Cocteau Twins – Lazy Calm (Luxxury Re-edit) (2010)
 Health – Eat Flesh (Baron von Luxxury Remix) (2010)
 The Burning Hotels – Stuck in the Middle (Baron von Luxxury Controls Everything Remix) (2009)
 Del Marquis – Runaround (Baron von Luxxury Remix) (2009)
 The Secret Handshake – All For You (Baron von Luxxury Remix) (2009)
 Little Boots – Meddle (Baron von Luxxury Remix) (2008)
 Glass Candy – I Always Say Yes (Baron von Luxxury Remix) (2008)
 Sunny Day Sets Fire – Brainless (Baron von Luxxury Remix) (2008)
 Robots in Disguise – The Sex Has Made Me Stupid (Baron von Luxxury Remix) (2008)
 Robots in Disguise – We're in the Music Biz (Baron von Luxxury Remix) (2008)
 Marianne Faithfull – Broken English (Baron von Luxxury Remix) (2008)
 Dirty Sanchez – Really Rich Italian Satanists (Baron von Luxxury Remix) (2008)
 CSS – A La La (Baron von Luxxury Remix) (2007)
 Scissors for Lefty – Ghetto Ways (Baron von Luxxury Remix) (2007)
 Luxxury – Drunk (Lovesick Vocoders at Night Remix) (2007)
 Hilary Duff – Stranger (Baron von Luxxury Remix) (2007)

References

External links

Luxxury Web site
Discogs entry for Luxxury'
Luxxury at Razor and Tie Publishing
Los Angeles Times
Interview with Baron von Luxxury at Pulse Radio
SF Gate
Review of Rock and Roll (is Evil)

Nu-disco musicians
Living people
American DJs
American male pop singers
American male singer-songwriters
American record producers
American synth-pop musicians
Electronic dance music DJs
Year of birth missing (living people)
American singer-songwriters